Stade de Reims won Division 1 season 1952/1953 of the French Association Football League with 48 points.

Participating teams

 Bordeaux
 Le Havre AC
 RC Lens
 Lille OSC
 Olympique de Marseille
 FC Metz
 SO Montpellier
 FC Nancy
 OGC Nice
 Nîmes Olympique
 RC Paris
 Stade de Reims
 Stade Rennais UC
 CO Roubaix-Tourcoing
 AS Saint-Etienne
 FC Sète
 FC Sochaux-Montbéliard
 Stade français (football)

Final table

Promoted from Division 2, who will play in Division 1 season 1953/1954
 Toulouse FC: Champion of Division 2
 AS Monaco: Runner-up
 RC Strasbourg: Third place

Results

Top goalscorers

References
 Division 1 season 1952-1953 at pari-et-gagne.com

Ligue 1 seasons
French
1